The 2017–18 season was AFC Wimbledon's 16th season in their history and their second season in League One.

League table

Results summary

Score overview

Matches

Pre-season friendlies

League One

August

September

October

November

December

January

February

March

April

May

FA Cup
On 16 October 2017, the draw for the first round took place with AFC Wimbledon hosting Lincoln City.

First round
At this stage, there were 80 clubs remaining in the competition (32 non-league teams progressing from the qualifying rounds and the 48 clubs from League One and League Two).

Second round
At this stage, there were 40 clubs remaining in the competition (10 non-league teams, 14 clubs from League One and 16 clubs League Two).

Third round
A total of 64 clubs will play in the third round (10 League One teams, 9 League Two teams and 44 teams from the Premier League and Football League Championship entering in this round) plus either Gillingham or Carlisle United.

EFL Cup
On 16 June 2017, the draw for the EFL Cup took place. The draw was seeded based on the league finishing positions for clubs in the previous season and regionalised on a north-south basis. AFC Wimbledon are unseeded, and drawn at home against Brentford. Meaning for the first time in 7 years entering the competition Wimbledon had been drawn at home.

First round
The First Round of the competition included 70 of the 72 Football League clubs: 24 from League Two, 24 from League One, and 22 from the Championship, with Hull City and Middlesbrough receiving a bye into the Second Round.

EFL Trophy
On 7 July 2017, the Group round draw was made for the League One and League Two teams competing in the EFL Trophy. The first round will consist of 64 clubs (24 from League One, 24 from League Two and 16 Category 1 Academy Teams) split into 16 groups of 4 teams, regionalised on a north/south basis, with each group including one Academy Team. Each club will play each other once, either home or away, with the top 2 teams from each group progressing to the knock-out stages.

First Round (Southern Group F)

If the scores are level at the end of a Group Match then each team is awarded 1 point. In addition, the match will be followed immediately by the taking of penalties and the team that wins the penalty shootout will be awarded 1 additional point. AFC Wimbledon qualified for the following round by finishing as runners-up.

Second Round (Southern Section)

The draw for the Second Round took place on 10 November 2017, with 32 clubs (13 from League One, 11 from League Two and 8 Category 1 Academy sides) progressing from the previous round, continuing to be regionalised on a north/south basis, with each group winner from the previous round being drawn at home to a second placed team from a different qualifying group.

Squad

Player statistics 

|-
|colspan="14"|Players who featured on loan for AFC Wimbledon but subsequently returned to their parent club:
|-
|colspan="14"|Players who left or were released by AFC Wimbledon during the course of the season:
|-
|}

Top scorers

Disciplinary record

Transfers

References

AFC Wimbledon seasons
AFC Wimbledon